The 2011–12 Israeli Hockey League season was the 21st season of Israel's hockey league. 10 teams participated in the league, and the Maccabi Metulla Eggenbreggers won the championship.

First round

Final round

Playoffs

3rd place game 
Monfort Ma'alot - Hawks Haifa 3:0

Final 
Maccabi Metulla Eggenbreggers - Icebergs Bat Yam 2:1 (0:0, 0:1, 1:0, 0:0, 1:0)

External links
Ice Hockey Federation of Israel

Is
Israeli League (ice hockey) seasons
Seasons